Eddie Gilbert Medal is an award for Queensland's best indigenous sports person. Eddie Gilbert was a Queensland indigenous fast bowler in the 1930s. The award is organised by Indigenous Sport Queensland.

List of Winners
 2007 - Johnathan Thurston (Rugby league)
 2008 - Rohanee Cox (Basketball)
 2009 - Not Held
 2010 - Greg Inglis (Rugby league)
 2011 -  Not Held
 2012 -  Not Held
 2013 -  Not Held
 2014 - Jesse Williams (Gridiron football) 
2015 - Johnathan Thurston (Rugby league)

References

External links
 Indigenous Sport Queensland

Australian sports trophies and awards
Awards honoring indigenous people
Indigenous Australian sport